WJLY is a Christian radio station licensed to Ramsey, Illinois, broadcasting on 88.3 MHz FM. The station serves the areas of Vandalia, Illinois, Effingham, Illinois, Pana, Illinois, Hillsboro, Illinois, and Shelbyville, Illinois, and is owned by Countryside Broadcasting.

References

External links
WJLY's official website

JLY